The Melbourne Prize for Literature is an award given by the Melbourne Prize Trust, which was founded by Simon Warrender in 2005. The trust grants awards on a rolling three-year basis for Urban Sculpture, Literature and Music, in that order.  The first award was presented for Urban Sculpture in 2005.

Melbourne Prize for Literature Recipients 
2006 Helen Garner
2009 Gerald Murnane
2012 Alex Miller
2015 Chris Wallace-Crabbe
2018 Alison Lester
2021 Christos Tsiolkas

Melbourne Prize for Music Recipients 
 2007 Professor Paul Grabowsky AO
2010 David Jones
2013 Brett Dean
 2016 Kutcha Edwards
 2019 Deborah Cheetham AO

Melbourne Prize for Urban Sculpture Recipients 
2005 OSW: Terri Bird, Bianca Hester, Natasha Johns-Messenger and Scott Mitchell
2008 Alexander Knox
 2011 Bianca Hester
 2014 Geoff Robinson
2017 Daniel von Sturmer
2020 Beth Arnold, Mikala Dwyer, Emily Floyd, Nicholas Mangan, Kathy Temin and Field Theory (shared between six finalists)

References

External links 
 Official website
Australian literary awards
Awards established in 2004